Vaľkovňa is a village and municipality in Brezno District, in the Banská Bystrica Region of central Slovakia.

References

External links
http://www.e-obce.sk/obec/valkovna/valkovna.html

Villages and municipalities in Brezno District